Elophila interruptalis is a moth in the family Crambidae. It was described by Pryer in 1877. It is found in Japan (Honshu, Shikoku, Kyushu), China and Korea.

The ground colour of the forewings is pale orange. Adults are on wing from June to November in two to three generations per year.

The larvae are polyphagous on aquatic plants, including water lilies. Young larvae mine the leaves of their host plant or feed on the underside of a leaf. Older larvae create a portable case made out of leaves. Full-grown larvae reach a length of 20–32 mm. They have a brownish white body and a light brown head.

References

Acentropinae
Moths described in 1877
Moths of Asia
Aquatic insects